Croatia originally planned to participate in the Eurovision Song Contest 2020 with the song "" written by Ante Pecotić. The song was performed by Damir Kedžo. The Croatian broadcaster Croatian Radiotelevision (HRT) organised the national final  to select the Croatian entry for the 2020 contest in Rotterdam, Netherlands. Fourteen entries competed in the national final on 29 February 2020 and "" performed by Damir Kedžo was selected as the winner following the combination of votes from five regional juries and a public televote.

Croatia was drawn to compete in the first semi-final of the Eurovision Song Contest which took place on 12 May 2020. However, the contest was cancelled due to the COVID-19 pandemic.

Background 

The nation's best result in the contest was fourth, which it achieved on two occasions: in 1996 with the song "" performed by Maja Blagdan and in 1999 with the song "" performed by Doris Dragović. Following the introduction of semi-finals in 2004, Croatia had thus far featured in seven finals. Since 2018, the Croatian entries failed to qualify from the semi-finals; the last time Croatia competed in the final was in 2017 with the song "My Friend" performed by Jacques Houdek. In 2019, Croatia failed to qualify to the final with Roko and the song "The Dream".

The Croatian national broadcaster, Croatian Radiotelevision (HRT), broadcasts the event within Croatia and organises the selection process for the nation's entry. HRT confirmed Croatia's participation in the 2020 Eurovision Song Contest on 10 September 2019. Between 1993 and 2011, HRT organised the national final  in order to select the Croatian entry for the Eurovision Song Contest. In 2012 and 2013, the broadcaster opted to internally select the entry. After missing the contest in 2014 and 2015, the Croatian broadcaster continued the internal selection procedure between 2016 and 2018. In 2019, HRT has used  to select Croatia's entry, a method that was continued for their 2020 participation.

Before Eurovision

Dora 2020
 was the twenty-first edition of the Croatian national selection  which selected Croatia's entry for the Eurovision Song Contest 2020. The competition consisted of sixteen entries competing in one final on 29 February 2020 at the Marino Cvetković Sports Hall in Opatija, hosted by Duško Ćurlić, Mirko Fodor, Zlata Mück Sušec and Doris Pinčić Rogoznica. The show was broadcast on HRT 1 as well as online via the broadcaster's streaming service HRTi.

Competing entries
On 5 November 2019, HRT opened a submission period where artists and composers were able to submit their entries to the broadcaster with the deadline on 15 December 2019. Songs submitted were required to be in English, French, Italian or Croatian. 181 entries were received by the broadcaster during the submission period. A seven-member expert committee consisting of Zlatko Turkalj Turki (HRT), Dinko Komadina (HRT), Željko Barba (HDS), Tomislav Mrduljaš (HDS), Ivana Vrdoljak Vanna (HGU), Branimir Jovanovac (HGU) and Tomislav Štengl (HRT) reviewed the received submissions and selected sixteen artists and songs for the competition. HRT announced the competing entries on 23 December 2019 and among the artists was Goran Karan who represented Croatia in the Eurovision Song Contest 2000. On 24 December 2019, Goran Karan withdrew his song "My Legacy Is Love", written by Nikša Bratoš, after it was revealed to have already been publicly performed and replaced with "" performed by Elis Lovrić. The running order of the final was determined by HRT and announced on 17 February 2020.

Final
The final took place on 29 February 2020. The winner, "" performed by Damir Kedžo, was determined by a 50/50 combination of votes from five regional juries and a public televote. Mia Negovetić and Damir Kedžo were tied at 31 points each but since Damir Kedžo received the most votes from the public he was declared the winner. In addition to the performances of the competing entries, the show was opened with 2019 Croatian Eurovision entrant Roko performing his song "Krila", while Albina Grčić, Bernarda Bobovečki, Filip Rudan and Roko performed as the interval acts.

At Eurovision 
According to Eurovision rules, all nations with the exceptions of the host country and the "Big Five" (France, Germany, Italy, Spain and the United Kingdom) are required to qualify from one of two semi-finals in order to compete for the final; the top ten countries from each semi-final progress to the final. The European Broadcasting Union (EBU) split up the competing countries into six different pots based on voting patterns from previous contests, with countries with favourable voting histories put into the same pot. On 28 January 2020, a special allocation draw was held which placed each country into one of the two semi-finals, as well as which half of the show they would perform in. Croatia was placed into the first semi-final, to be held on 12 May 2020, and was scheduled to perform in the second half of the show. However, due to the COVID-19 pandemic, the contest was cancelled.

Prior to the Eurovision Song Celebration YouTube broadcast in place of the semi-finals, it was revealed that Croatia was set to perform in position 11, following the entry from Malta and before the entry from Azerbaijan.

References

External links

2020
Countries in the Eurovision Song Contest 2020
Eurovision